Abu Ja'far Ahmad al-Tahawi (853 – 5 November 933), or simply aṭ-Ṭaḥāwī, was an Egyptian Arab Hanafi jurist and Traditionalist theologian. He studied with his uncle al-Muzani and was a Shafi'i jurist, before then changing to the Hanafi school. He is known for his work al-'Aqidah al-Tahawiyyah, a summary of Sunni Islamic creed which influenced Hanafis in Egypt.

Name 
According to al-Dhahabi, his name was Abu Ja'far Ahmad ibn Muhammad ibn Salamah ibn 'Abd al-Malik ibn Salamah, al-Azdi al-Hajari al-Misri al-Tahawi al-Hanafi.

Biography
Aṭ-Ṭaḥāwī was born in the village of Ṭaḥā in upper Egypt in 853 (239 AH) to an affluent Arab family of Azdī origins. He began his studies with his maternal uncle, Ismāʿīl ibn Yaḥyā al-Muzanī, a leading disciple of ash-Shāfiʿī, but in 873 (259 AH), at approximately 20 years of age, aṭ-Ṭaḥāwī abandoned the Shāfiʿī school of jurisprudence in favour of the Ḥanafī school. Different versions are given by his biographers of his conversion to the Ḥanafī school, but the most probable reason seems to be that the system of Abū Ḥanīfa appealed to his critical insight more than that of ash-Shāfiʿī.

Aṭ-Ṭaḥāwī then studied under the head of the Ḥanafīs in Egypt, Aḥmad ibn Abī ʿImrān al-Ḥanafī, who had himself studied under the two primary students of Abū Ḥanīfa, Abū Yūsuf and Muḥammad ash-Shaybānī. Aṭ-Ṭaḥāwī then travelled to Syria in 882 (268 AH) for further studies in Ḥanafī jurisprudence and became pupil to Abū Khāzim ʿAbd al-Ḥamīd ibn ʿAbd al-ʿAzīz, the chief qāḍi of Damascus.

Aṭ-Ṭaḥāwī gained a vast knowledge of ḥadīth in addition to Ḥanafī jurisprudence and his study circles consequently attracted many students of knowledge who related ḥadīth from him and transmitted his works. Among them were al-Da'udi, the head of the Zahiris in Khurasan, and aṭ-Ṭabarānī, well known for his biographical dictionaries of ḥadīth transmitters.

Aṭ-Ṭaḥāwī was famed for his expertise in both ḥadīth and Ḥanafī jurisprudence even during his own lifetime, and many of his works, such as Kitāb Maʿāni al-Āthār and ʿAqīdah aṭ-Ṭaḥāwīyyah, continue to be held in high regard by Sunni Muslims today.

He died on the 14th day of Dhū-l Qaʿdah, 321 AH (5 November 933 CE), and was buried in al-Qarāfah, Cairo.

Legacy
Many of aṭ-Ṭaḥāwī's contemporaries praised him and noted him as both a reliable scholar and narrator of ḥadīth. He was widely held as a distinguished and prolific writer and became known as the most learned faqīh amongst the Ḥanafīs in Egypt, despite having knowledge of all the madhāhib. Over fifteen commentaries have been produced on his creedal treatise, ʿAqīdah aṭ-Ṭaḥāwīyyah, including shuruh by the Hanafi jurist Ismail ibn Ibrahim al-Shaybani and the Taymiyyan-inclined Ibn Abi al-Izz.

Works
He authored many other works, close to forty different books, some of which are still available today, including:
 Maʿāni al-Āthār (معاني الآثار)
 al-ʿAqīdah aṭ-Ṭaḥāwīyyah (العقيدة الطحاوية)
 Aḥkām al-Qur’ān al-Karīm (أحكام القرآن الكريم)
 Al-Mukhtaṣar fil-Furūʿ (المختصر في الفروع)
 Sharḥ Mushkil al-Āthār (شرح مشكل الآثار)
 Sharḥ Maʿāni al-Āthār (شرح معاني الآثار)
 Sharḥ al-Jāmiʿ al-Kabīr (شرح الجامع الكبير)
 Sharḥ al-Jāmiʿ aṣ-Ṣaghīr (شرح الجامع الصغير)
 Ash-Shurūṭ aṣ-Ṣaghīr (الشروط الصغير)
 Ash-Shurūṭ al-Kabīr (الشروط الكبير)
 Ikhtilāf al-ʿUlamā’ (إختلاف العلماء)
 ʿUqūd al-Marjān fī Manāqib Abī Ḥanīfa an-Nuʿmān (عقود المرجان قي مناقب أبي حنيفة النعمان)
 Tārīkh al‑Kabīr (تاريخ الكبير)
 Ḥukm Arāḍi Makkah al-Mukarramah (حكم أراضي مكة المكرمة)

See also
 Islamic scholars

References

Mujaddid
Egyptian Sunni Muslim scholars of Islam
Hadith scholars
843 births
933 deaths
Hanafi fiqh scholars
Hanafis
9th-century jurists
10th-century jurists